Furman University is a private liberal arts university in Greenville, South Carolina. Founded in 1826 and named for the clergyman Richard Furman, Furman University is the oldest private institution of higher learning in South Carolina. It became a secular university in 1992, while keeping Christo et Doctrinae (For Christ and Learning) as its motto. It enrolls approximately 2,700 undergraduate students and 200 graduate students, representing 46 states and 53 foreign countries, on its  campus.

History

Beginnings (19th century)
Furman Academy and Theological Institution was established by the South Carolina Baptist Convention and incorporated in December 1825 in Edgefield. With 10 students, it held its first classes January 15, 1828; although another source says it opened in January 1827. Through 1850, average enrollment was 10 students, and it constantly tottered on the edge of insolvency. From 1829 to 1834, it operated in the High Hills of the Santee (now Stateburg, South Carolina). Furman closed from 1834 to 1837. When the school reopened, at the urging of the Reverend Jonathan Davis, chairman of the Board of Agents, the school moved to his native Fairfield County, near Winnsboro.

In 1850, the state legislature chartered Furman University. It was not until 1851 that South Carolina Baptists were able to raise the necessary funds for the removal of the school to Greenville, South Carolina.

The university closed from 1861 to 1866, when "most students and several faculty members enlisted in the Confederate forces."

The Furman Institution Faculty Residence serves as a visible reminder of the early history of Furman University and its brief establishment in Fairfield County.

Growth and expansion (20th century)

The first school building from the downtown Greenville campus was transported to the current campus, where it still stands. In 1933, students from the Greenville Women's College began attending classes with Furman students. Shortly thereafter, the two schools merged to form the present institution.

In 1924, Furman was named one of four collegiate beneficiaries of the Duke Endowment. Through 2007, Furman has received $110 million from the endowment, which is now one of the nation's largest philanthropic foundations. Three other colleges—Duke, Davidson and Johnson C. Smith—also receive annual support and special grants from the endowment.

In 1954, Brown v. Board of Education found the "separate but equal" policy to be unconstitutional, starting the lengthy process of desegregating public schools. As of that date, Furman, like most Southern colleges, did not accept African Americans as students. Some Furman students began to press for change. In 1955, some students wrote short stories and poems in The Echo, a student literary magazine, in support of integration; school administrators destroyed all 1,500 printed copies. Classes on the new campus began in 1958.

By 1963, enough faculty were siding with the students over racial desegregation that Furman's board of trustees voted to admit Black students. Action on the trustees' decision was postponed and it was later overturned by South Carolina's Baptist Convention; desegregated admission was not implemented at Furman until its incoming president, Gordon Blackwell, a past president of Florida State University, made it a condition of his acceptance of the new position. In February 1965, Joe Vaughn, a graduate of Sterling High School, became Furman's first Black undergraduate.

In 1992, Furman ended its affiliation with the South Carolina Baptist Convention and became a private, secular university, while keeping Christo et Doctrinae (For Christ and Learning) as the school's motto. Furman's "heritage is rooted in the non-creedal, free church Baptist tradition which has always valued particular religious commitments while insisting not only on the freedom of the individual to believe as he or she sees fit but also on respect for a diversity of religious perspectives, including the perspective of the non-religious person."

Recent history (21st century)
The 2010s were transformative years for Furman through fundraising, resulting in new buildings, programs, and scholarships. The Because Furman Matters campaign began in 2004 and ended in 2013. The campaign was described as "the largest fundraising campaign ever among private colleges in South Carolina, and is also among the largest undertaken by any of the nation’s liberal arts colleges.". It exceeded its objective of raising $400 million, of which 62% went to the endowment (which was valued at $380 million when the campaign started and increased to $623 million when it ended) and 17% went to building projects. Several such buildings were supported by successful graduates from the university via naming gifts. In 2012, a new $6.4 million facility was built for continuing education. The Herring Center for Continuing Education was supported by Sarah and Gordon Herring, a leader in the television industry who served on committees with HBO and was one of the founders of the Weather Channel. In 2013, the student center went through a $7.75 million expansion and renovation. The alumnus and businessman David Trone, together with his wife June, participated through a $3.5 million gift resulting in the center being named the Trone Student Center.

In addition to visible changes in campus buildings, significant donations have also enabled a new campus-wide program presented as The Furman Advantage. The infrastructure and networks necessary to support The Furman Advantage were made possible when Furman received $47 million from The Duke Endowment. The new program, unveiled in 2016, seeks to increase and personalize the experiences of students beyond the classroom. This includes strengthening the university's engagement with the Greenville community, where students are provided with internships and opportunities for engaged learning. For instance, a new program in partnership with Greenville Health System, the Institute for the Advancement of Community Health, provides a conduit for students and faculty to contribute to the community. The Furman Advantage also provides more stipends for students to partake into faculty-mentored research. The growing interest and infrastructure for research at Furman can also be witnessed in the creation of the annual Faculty Scholarship Reception.

While students and visitors are most likely to notice newer and renovated buildings, or experience campus wide programs, changes have also been more subtle in several other aspects. For instance, alumni have continued to fuel the development of scholarship funds for specific purposes. In 2017, a $2.2 million bequest from the late Mary Frances Edwards Garrett was dedicated to a fund for students seeking teaching and ministerial professions.

Task Force on Slavery and Justice
In October 2018, a Task Force on Slavery and Justice, set up by Provost George Shields, issued a report, Seeking Abraham, making recommendations "to acknowledge the role slavery and racism had in the school’s history." The task force is a response to the article, "Slavery, Memory and Reconciliation: What is the Furman Legacy?", published in October 2016 in the university newspaper, pointing out that Richard Furman, the university's namesake, and even more so his son James Clement Furman, Furman's first president, were not only slave owners but active defenders of slavery. "Abraham" is a reference to Abraham Sims, a slave at the house of James Furman.

The task force issued 19 recommendations, which were unanimously accepted by Furman's board of trustees. James C. Furman Hall will be renamed Furman Hall, and a statue will be erected to honor Joseph Vaughn, "the first Black student to attend the school". A tour of the university, "Seeking Abraham", looks at campus "from the perspective of the native people who first called the campus home, the enslaved and laborers, the women who pushed against the Furmans' views, the eventual students and faculty who pushed desegregation forward, and the Baptists who eventually broke with their own Convention.... Much of this history is 'hidden' in the current landscape."

Organization and administration

Leadership and guidance to the university is provided by a board of trustees, whose 36 members meet at least three times per academic year and are elected for three-year terms. Former board members may be designated as 'Trustees Emeriti'. These include former Governor and U.S. secretary of education Richard Riley. , current board members include Robert Blocker, dean of the school of Music at Yale University, and William Byrd Traxler Jr., Chief Judge of the United States Court of Appeals. Board members also come from private companies such as ExxonMobil Chemical Company (former president), AT&T (legal counsel), or Michelin (general counsel).

Under the governance of the board of trustees, Furman is led by a President. Elizabeth Davis became Furman's president on July 1, 2014. She is the 12th president of the institution, or 16th when also counting interim presidents. Twelve senior administrators manage academic and administrative departments. These administrators are composed of a provost, four academic deans, and seven other members (e.g., Chief Diversity Officer, General Counsel).

Academics

Furman offers majors and programs in 42 subjects. All students must complete general education requirements as part of the liberal arts curriculum. The general education requirements include mind and body wellness, textual analysis, two natural sciences, math/formal reasoning, two empirical studies of human behavior, history, ultimate question, foreign language, and world culture. Furman is not divided into colleges, but includes centers and four institutes. Furman's four institutes are the Shi Institute for Sustainable Communities, the Richard W. Riley Institute, the Institute for the Advancement of Community Health, and the Hill Institute for Innovation and Entrepreneurship. Its most popular undergraduate majors, by 2021 graduates, were:
Exercise Science and Kinesiology (58)
Biology/Biological Sciences (51)
Speech Communication and Rhetoric (48)
Political Science and Government (47)
Business Administration and Management (46)
Psychology (41)

Between 1996 and 2003, 308 Furman graduates received PhD degrees, the most by any Southern liberal arts college, according to a survey by the National Opinion Research Center. Furman has produced 20 Truman Scholars, as well as several Rhodes scholars and recipients of Goldwater, Fulbright and National Science Foundation Awards.

Rankings

Furman University was the third-highest ranked institution of higher learning in South Carolina (in 2022) and the 21st-best university in the South of US (in 2019) by Forbes, and the 5th best liberal arts college in the South by U.S. News & World Report. For 2020, it was also ranked the 5th most innovative liberal arts college by U.S. News. It is considered to be a "more selective" school. Furman is also featured in The Princeton Review's "Best 378 Colleges" list, where it is named a "Best Southeastern College" and ranked #9 in the impact schools category.

Furman has also been mentioned in other specialized lists such as The Daily Beasts 2011 edition of "Most Rigorous Colleges in America", where it was ranked 2nd. It was also ranked 30th among U.S. colleges and universities in an NBER working paper based on the choice to enroll of the highest-achieving students in US.

Over time, Furman has also been featured in specialized rankings such as the Washington Monthly rankings based on its production of valuable research to society and its commitment to national service, where it was ranked 15th in the nation. Business Insider also ranked Furman in 5th place on its list of universities committed to national service in 2016. Furman ties in 4th place among all liberal arts in the nation in number of Truman Scholars. Its undergraduate research program has been ranked as high as 4th in the U.S. News Best Undergraduate Research Programs.

Furman ranked 1st for number of undergraduates receiving PhDs among all liberal arts colleges in the South from 1996 to 2003 and 22nd among all liberal arts in the nation. From 2006 to 2015 Furman ranked 1st in the South and 26th among all liberal arts in the nation. Furman ranked 6th in percentage of graduates that went on to receive PHds from 2006 to 2017 among all the universities in the South, and 76th among all universities in the nation.

Publications have taken notice of several aspects of the academic experience at Furman, as well as its environmental responsibility. The university's engaged learning academic program, which promotes problem-solving, project-oriented, experience-based education, has been mentioned in The Princeton Review, Peterson's Competitive Colleges, The Fiske Guide to Colleges and The College Board College Handbook. The Princeton Review featured Furman in its "Guide to 286 Green Colleges," where it received a green rating of 98, with 99 being the highest possible score. Additionally, the Sierra Club included Furman in its list of the top 50 eco-friendly universities in America. Furman received a grade of "A−" from the Sustainable Endowments Institute on its College Sustainability Report Card in 2011. Furman takes part in the voluntary self-reporting Sustainability Tracking Assessment Ratings System (STARS), where it was one of 38 institutions to achieve a gold rating.

Furman's campus has also received special attention in the rankings and is considered one of the most beautiful campuses in the world and the nation. The landscaping and attractiveness of the campus have been recognized for many years: in 1997, Planning for Higher Education named Furman as a benchmark campus for its landscaping, while The Princeton Review ranked Furman fifth in its list of beautiful campuses based on student ratings. In 2016, USA Today named Furman's campus as the 4th most beautiful campus in the nation and Times Higher Education named it as one of the ten most beautiful campuses in the nation in 2017. More recently, in 2019, Travel + Leisure listed Furman as one of the most beautiful college campuses in the United States. Another specific part of Furman mentioned in rankings is the James B. Duke Library, which scored favorably for several years (based on student assessment of library facilities), being ranked from 7 to 12 (in 2010) by The Princeton Review.

Campus

Furman University's campus is located at the foothills of the Blue Ridge Mountains in the upstate region of South Carolina. A  lake is a highlight of the  wooded campus. Paris Mountain State Park overlooks the lake and campus. Most buildings are of Georgian-style architecture. Many academic buildings and student residences stand around the lake, including the Bell Tower, which figures highly in school insignias and is a replica of the tower that once existed on the men's campus in downtown Greenville. Today, the campus is anchored by its newly expanded  James B. Duke Library. Informally known as "The Country Club of the South," Furman was named one of the 362 most beautiful places in America by the American Society of Landscape Architects.

Timmons Arena

Timmons Arena is a 4,000-seat multi-purpose arena in Greenville, in the U.S. state of South Carolina. It was built in 1997 at a cost of $10.9 million by Stanmar, Inc., and is home to the Furman University Paladins basketball team since its opening on December 30, 1997.

Housing
On the north side of the lake are the four Greenbelt housing cabins, and the Cliffs Cottage. This  "green" building designed by Scott Johnston is solar-powered using two panels, and features geothermal heating. Cliffs Cottage was the first sustainable showcase home for Southern Living magazine, which featured it in the article Our Most Innovative House Ever, detailing how to create a house that requires less energy and generates power. The cottage now serves as home for the Shi Institute for Sustainable Communities.

Most juniors and seniors live in North Village Apartments, located on the north side of the Cliffs Cottage. The North Village Apartments were built and most recently renovated in 2001. The remaining upperclassmen are either placed in dorm-style residence halls or enter a lottery to receive an apartment in The Vinings, an apartment complex next to campus owned by the university. There are two other residence complexes (called Clark Murphy Housing Complex and South Housing) which house freshmen and sophomores. The campus also includes an Asian Garden, the centerpiece of which is the Place of Peace, a Buddhist temple moved to the site from Japan and reconstructed by traditional carpenters. A replica of the cabin that Henry David Thoreau inhabited while writing On Walden Pond is located on the west side of the lake.

Other points of interest

 Bell Tower and Burnside Carillon, a 59-bell carillon by Van Bergen
 Charles Ezra Daniel Memorial Chapel's Hartness Organ
 Cherrydale Alumni House
 Shi Institute for Sustainable Communities 
 Doughboy Statue honoring Furman students who served in World War I
 James B. Duke Library's Special Collections & Archives department, which houses the South Carolina Baptist Historical Collection and the South Carolina Poetry Archives
 Janie Earle Furman Rose Garden
 Place of Peace and Asia Garden
 Replica of Thoreau's Walden cabin

Environmental sustainability
Furman University sustainability efforts have been in keeping with national standards. Furman works to conserve, reduce, and recycle on campus, has constructed green buildings and provided students with alternative transportation. Furman has its own farm on campus. The Furman Farm is a quarter-acre garden located beside the Cliffs Cottage and the Furman Lake. A wide variety of produce is grown throughout the year using sustainable agricultural practices such as crop rotations, composting, drip lines, natural fertilizers, and integrated pest management. Furman also has installed a 6-acre solar farm with a 743 kW solar photovoltaic (PV) array near the campus entrance. The university hopes to achieve carbon neutrality by 2026.

Student body

In Fall 2016, Furman's 2,731 students came from 46 states and more than 50 countries. When applying to Furman, the university computes the GPA on a scale of 4.0 based on core courses (e.g. excluding physical education). While Furman does not apply a GPA cut-off, the average unweighted GPA ranges from a 3.6 to 3.9.

Almost 90% of the financial aid to students comes in the form of scholarships and grants, with loans accounting for less than 9%.

Student life

Student government
Furman University Student Government Association (SGA) works under a semi-Presidential system. SGA is made up of the executive council: president, vice president, treasurer, and secretary. Each class elects four representatives. Upon election council members are assigned within one of six committees to specialize in a particular area of student needs.

Fraternities and sororities
Furman University has five fraternities and six sororities. Fraternities on campus: Beta Theta Pi, Pi Kappa Phi, Sigma Chi, Sigma Alpha Epsilon and Sigma Nu. Sororities on campus: Alpha Delta Pi, Chi Omega, Delta Delta Delta, Delta Gamma, Kappa Delta, and Zeta Tau Alpha. The school also has two music based fraternities including Phi Mu Alpha Sinfonia, a men's social fraternity with emphasis in music, along with Sigma Alpha Iota, a primarily female professional music organization. The school has recently added chapters of Alpha Kappa Alpha and Kappa Alpha Psi in 2021, two Black Greek-letter organizations.

Other organizations

Furman University is also a host to a myriad of other organizations. Most notable are FUSAB (Furman University Student Activities Board), an organization that plans diverse and educational events on and off campus for students; Heller Service Corps, who complete service projects that directly benefit the Furman and Greenville community; and Shucker Leadership Institute, which focuses on shaping freshman and sophomore students into strong leaders on campus.

Athletics

Furman competes in NCAA Division I athletics, and at the FCS (Football Championship Subdivision) level in football and is one of the smallest NCAA Division I schools in the nation. Furman fields seven men's teams and nine women's teams, as well as 16 club sports and many intramural teams. The university is a member of the Southern Conference.

Furman is the only liberal arts college to be ranked in Sports Illustrated Top-100 America's Best Sports Colleges and has 32 former student-athletes competing at the professional level—the most of any Southern Conference member school.

In 2018, Furman placed in the top 75 best colleges in the NACDA Directors' Cup Division I Final Standings, being the only liberal arts college in the US and only member of the Southern Conference to do so. In the 2019–2020 season, Furman finished in 32nd place in the NACDA Director's Cup Final Fall Standings. Despite its small size, Furman has had several of its sports teams ranked in the NCAA Div 1 Top 25 in the nation in recent times: men's football at #2 in NCAA-I-AA, men's soccer at #3 in the nation, women's golf at #8, men's cross country at #7, women's cross country at #9, men's basketball at #23 and women's tennis at #24.

Furman ranks 77th in the nation among universities with most Olympic medals and ranks 2nd in the nation among liberal arts schools.

The team nickname, the Paladins, was first used by a Greenville, South Carolina, sportswriter in the 1930s. For many years the name "Paladins" just referred to Furman's basketball team. Until 1961 the school's baseball teams were known as the "Hornets" and the football teams as the "Hurricanes". On September 15, of that year, the student body voted to make "Paladins" the official nickname of all of the university's intercollegiate athletic teams.

Notable alumni

Furman University is the alma mater to a head of government, a Nobel Prize laureate, winners of the Grammy Award, Emmy Award, Pulitzer Award and the Newbery Medal, as well as U.S. Senators, U.S. Congressmen, state governors, and other government officials, judges, business leaders, entertainers, and athletes. Notable alumni include:

 Charles H Townes, physicist, 1964 Nobel Prize Winner in Physics
John B. Watson, psychologist, founder of Behaviorism
Richard Riley, United States Secretary of Education under President Bill Clinton
 Herman W. Lay, founder of Frito-Lay potato chips
 Eleanor Beardsley, bilingual journalist and foreign correspondent for National Public Radio based in Paris
Amy Grant, contemporary Christian/pop artist and 6-time Grammy Award winner
John Michael McDonnell, Admiral, former Director of the National Security Agency, and former Director of National Intelligence in President George W. Bush's administration
Brad Cox, computer scientist, creator of the Objective-C programming language
Keith Lockhart, conductor, music director of the Boston Pops Orchestra, and Principal Conductor of the BBC Concert Orchestra
Thomas T. Goldsmith Jr., television pioneer, the co-inventor of the first arcade game to use a cathode-ray tube
Alexander Stubb, politician, former prime minister of Finland
Judy Clarke, criminal defense attorney who has represented high-profile defendants
Robert Blocker, dean of the Yale School of Music
John F. Mulholland Jr., former CIA associate director
Mark Sanford, politician, former Governor of South Carolina and former U.S. Representative for South Carolina's 1st district
Brad Faxon, retired professional golfer, won eight PGA Tour events 
 Tomiko Brown-Nagin, legal historian, former dean at Harvard University
Clint Dempsey, retired professional soccer player
Beth Daniel, 33 LPGA Tour events winner and member of the World Golf Hall of Fame
Sam Wyche, former head coach for the Cincinnati Bengals and quarterbacks coach for the San Francisco 49ers
Robert G. Owens Jr., Major general, U.S. Marine Corps and flying ace
Victoria Jackson, actress and comedian, former cast member of NBC Saturday Night Live
Ben Browder, actor, writer and director
 David C. Garrett Jr., businessman, former CEO of Delta Air Lines
Allie Beth Stuckey, podcast host, blogger, and conservative commentator.
Xavier Woods, WWE superstar and YouTube personality 
Julie McElrath, world-leading HIV immunology and vaccine researcher
 Jay Jackson, Major League Baseball pitcher

Notable faculty 

 Jay Bocook, composer and arranger, whose work was heard during the 1984 Olympic Games Opening Ceremonies in Los Angeles
 Thomas T. Goldsmith Jr., physicist, who helped pioneer the invention of color television, and inventor of the first video game
 Richard Riley, politician, Governor of South Carolina and sixth U.S. Secretary of Education
 Mark Kilstofte, musician, winner of the American Academy in Rome's Rome Prize for 2002–2003
 Charles H Townes, physicist, 1964 Nobel Prize winner in Physics
 John B. Watson, psychologist, founder of Behaviorism
Alan Axelrod, historian and author of business and management books
Brent Nelsen, political scientist and professor
Anthony Ensolen, writer and translator of classical works
Edvard Tchivzhel, conductor and music director
William Preucil, composer, violinist and Grammy Award winner

See also 
 South Carolina Baptist Historical Collection
 South Carolina Poetry Archives

References
Furman University Website (A)

Newspapers (B)

Ranking websites (C)

Other sources (D)

Further reading

External links
 
 Furman Athletics website

 
Liberal arts colleges in South Carolina
Educational institutions established in 1826
Universities and colleges accredited by the Southern Association of Colleges and Schools
Education in Greenville, South Carolina
Buildings and structures in Greenville, South Carolina
Tourist attractions in Greenville, South Carolina
1826 establishments in South Carolina
Private universities and colleges in South Carolina